Tiempo de revancha (English language: Time for Revenge) is a 1981 Argentine crime drama film written and directed by Adolfo Aristarain and starring Federico Luppi, Julio De Grazia, Haydée Padilla and Ulises Dumont. It was produced by Héctor Olivera and Luis O. Repetto. The music was composed by Emilio Kauderer. The film premiered in Argentina on July 30, 1981, and won 10 awards, including the Silver Condor for Best Film and Best Film (ex aequo) in the Montréal World Film Festival.

Tiempo de revancha is not only considered as a classic in Latin American cinema and a cult film, but also as a powerful allegory that deals directly with Argentina's last civil-military dictatorship, which was still ruling the country when it was released.

It was selected as the fifth greatest Argentine film of all time in a poll conducted by the Museo del Cine Pablo Ducrós Hicken in 1984, while it ranked 9th in the 2000 edition. In a new version of the survey organized in 2022 by the specialized magazines La vida util, Taipei and La tierra quema, presented at the Mar del Plata International Film Festival, the film reached the 3 position.

Synopsis 
Pedro Bengoa, an ex-union organizing demolition worker, and Bruno Di Toro, an old friend of his, decide to blackmail the corrupt company they work for. They set up a fake accident in a copper pit, in which Di Toro pretends to have been struck mute as a consequence of an explosion, and Pedro would corroborate his story. During the explosion things don't go as planned and Di Toro loses his life, leaving Pedro to continue the plan on his own, still pretending to be mute. However, when the company finally agrees to a financial settlement, Pedro refuses to accept; he now wants only justice, and his case goes to the courts. This event changes Pedro's life forever.

Cast 
 Federico Luppi ... Pedro Bengoa
 Haydée Padilla ... Amanda Bengoa
 Julio De Grazia ... Larsen
 Ulises Dumont ... Bruno Di Toro
 Joffre Soares ... Aitor
 Aldo Barbero ... Rossi
 Enrique Liporace ... Basile
 Arturo Maly ... García Brown
 Rodolfo Ranni ... Torrens
 Jorge Hacker ... Don Guido Ventura
 Alberto Benegas ... Golo
 Ingrid Pelicori ... Lea Bengoa
 Jorge Chernov ... Jorge
 Cayetano Biondo ... Bautista
 Marcos Woinsky ... Polaco
 Marcela Sotelo
 Lidia Catalano
 Cristina Arocca
 Héctor Calori
 Carlos Verón
 Carlos Trigo
 Osvaldo De la Vega
 Aldo Pastur
 Enrique Latorre
 Jorge Velurtas
 Rafael Casadó
 Enrique Otranto

References

External links 
 

1981 films
1981 crime drama films
1980s psychological thriller films
Argentine crime drama films
1980s Spanish-language films
Films about Latin American military dictatorships
Films set in the 1980s
Films set in Argentina
Political drama films
Argentine films about revenge
1980s Argentine films